Huygens is an impact crater on Mars named in honour of the Dutch astronomer, mathematician and physicist Christiaan Huygens. It is the fifth largest recognizable impact crater on Mars after Utopia, Hellas, Argyre, and Isidis, and the largest one with a near intact rim.

Scientists were delighted to see branched channels in pictures taken with spacecraft that were sent in orbit around Mars. The existence of these channels is strong evidence that much water once flowed on the surface of the planet. Simple organisms may have once lived where water once was. An excellent group of these channels is shown in the picture below from the rim of Huygens taken with THEMIS.

Carbonates (calcium or iron carbonates) were discovered in a crater on the rim of Huygens. The impact on the rim exposed material that had been dug up from the impact that created Huygens. These minerals represent evidence that Mars once had a thicker carbon dioxide atmosphere with abundant moisture. Carbonates of these kinds only form when there is much water. They were found with the Compact Reconnaissance Imaging Spectrometer for Mars (CRISM) instrument on the Mars Reconnaissance Orbiter. Earlier, the instrument had detected clay minerals. The carbonates were found near the clay minerals. Both of these  minerals form in wet environments. It is supposed that billions of years ago Mars was much warmer and wetter. At that time, carbonates would have formed from water and the carbon dioxide-rich atmosphere. Later the deposits of carbonate would have been buried. The double impact has now exposed the minerals. Earth has vast carbonate deposits in the form of limestone.

Images

See also 
 Climate of Mars
 Geology of Mars
 HiRISE
 HiWish program
 Hydrothermal circulation
 Impact crater
 Impact event
 List of craters on Mars
 Ore resources on Mars
 Planetary nomenclature
 Water on Mars

References

Impact craters on Mars
Christiaan Huygens
Iapygia quadrangle